The 1987 Masters (officially the 1987 Benson & Hedges Masters) was a professional non-ranking snooker tournament that took place between 25 January and 1 February 1987 at the Wembley Conference Centre in London, England.

Alex Higgins dominated the tournament. He defeated Terry Griffiths in the first round 5–4, after being 2–4 down, and won the match before his fans invaded the Wembley Conference Centre to greet him similar to his 1985 match with Steve Davis in the same round. He then cruised past World Champion Joe Johnson and Tony Meo before facing fellow Irishman Dennis Taylor in the final, which turned out to be a late night finish. Higgins led 8–5 by the evening session, but Taylor won the last 4 frames to win his only Masters title and his first major title since beating Steve Davis in the 1985 World Championship.

This was the first, and to date only, major final to feature 2 players from Northern Ireland. It also stood as the last time a player from Northern Ireland had won a Triple Crown title for over 30 years until Mark Allen's victory in the 2018 Masters.

Also in the 1987 Masters, Ray Reardon made his last appearance in the competition, when he played Joe Johnson. Cliff Thorburn failed to make it three Masters titles in row, when he lost 5–6 to Dennis Taylor in the semi-final. The highest break of the tournament was 136 made by Jimmy White.

Field
Defending champion Cliff Thorburn was the number 1 seed with World Champion Joe Johnson seeded 2. The remaining places were allocated to players based on the world rankings. Neal Foulds was making his debut in the Masters.

Main draw

{{16TeamBracket
| seed-width  =
| team-width  = 180
| score-width =
| RD1= Last 16 Best of 9 frames
| RD2= Quarter-finals Best of 9 frames
| RD3= Semi-finals Best of 11 frames
| RD4= Final Best of 17 frames
| RD1-seed01=1
| RD1-team01=
| RD1-score01=5
| RD1-seed02=16
| RD1-team02=
| RD1-score02=1
| RD1-seed03=8
| RD1-team03=
| RD1-score03=5
| RD1-seed04=9
| RD1-team04=
| RD1-score04=3
| RD1-seed05=5
| RD1-team05=
| RD1-score05=2
| RD1-seed06=12
| RD1-team06=

Final

Century breaks
Total: 7
 136  Jimmy White
 111, 106, 105, 101  Dennis Taylor
 108  Alex Higgins
 101  Tony Meo

References 

Masters (snooker)
Masters Snooker
Masters Snooker
Masters (snooker)
Masters Snooker
Masters Snooker